Walk in My Soul is a 1985 historical novel by Lucia St. Clair Robson.

Plot summary
Walk in My Soul is the story of Tiana Rogers of the Cherokee, the young Sam Houston, and the Trail of Tears.

Tiana grew up learning the magic, spells, and nature religion of the Cherokee. In a tribe that revered the life force that was female, she became a beloved woman—priestess, healer, and teacher.

Known as the "father of Texas", the young Sam Houston ran away on a lark from his family's general store in Maryville, Tennessee, to live among the Cherokee.  He hunted and played ritual games with the men and was adopted as a headman's son and was known as "Raven".

Houston falls in love with Tiana, but due to their differing racial and cultural backgrounds, conflict ensues.

External links
Walk in My Soul, author's website

1985 American novels
American historical novels
Novels by Lucia St. Clair Robson
Ballantine Books books
Trail of Tears